The National New York Central Railroad Museum  is a railroad museum located in Elkhart, Indiana dedicated to the preservation of the New York Central Railroad (NYC).

The museum includes several outdoor equipment displays, indoor model railroads, artifacts from the NYC and other railroad related exhibits including educational displays pertaining to the history of railroading. The museum is currently expanding its dedication to the preservation of both local and national railroad heritage. The museum consists of a modified NYC 20th Century Limited train set and freight house built by the Lake Shore & Michigan Southern Railway (LS&MS) in 1907.

History
Elkhart was a vital link between East and West during the growth of railroading in the U.S. In 1833 the LS&MS built a line through town; it was later acquired by the NYC in 1914.

The museum is situated opposite the Norfolk Southern Railway (NS) east–west main line;  NS freight trains pass approximately every 15 minutes. Amtrak's Elkhart Station is also within walking distance; daily service is provided by the Lake Shore Limited (Chicago-Boston/New York) and Capitol Limited (Chicago-Washington, D.C.).

Equipment

Locomotives

Steam
New York Central 3001 (Alco #69338 of 1940): The largest surviving example of the NYC's modern steam power technology; only surviving L-3a class Mohawk; one of two surviving NYC 4-8-2 engines; one of the fastest locomotives of its time; primarily designed for mountain grades, it hauled passengers at speeds up to  along the NYC's "Water Level Route" in the state of New York.

Diesel
 1953 EMD E8 (NYC #4085): lead locomotive of the eastbound 20th Century Limited when it left Chicago, Illinois for final run on December 2, 1967.

Electric
 Electric Interurban Car 15 of the Chicago South Shore & South Bend Railroad, built 1926.

Cabooses
 1974 Conrail bay window caboose #21230

Miscellaneous  
several Pullman Company railcars
150 ton (165 Tonnes) crane
two steel Baltimore & Ohio Railroad freight cars
250 ton (275 Tonnes) self-propelled crane
railroad post office
PRR diner car

Interior displays 
 Model railroads
 NYC memorabilia

See also
 NYC Mohawk
 20th Century Limited
 List of heritage railroads in the United States

References

External links
 National New York Central Railroad Museum The Official Website

Railroad museums in Indiana
Buildings and structures in Elkhart, Indiana
Museums in Elkhart County, Indiana
Former railway stations in Indiana
Railway freight houses
1987 establishments in Indiana
Museums established in 1987